The 2021 Rugby League World Cup group stage may refer to:
 2021 Men's Rugby League World Cup group stage
 2021 Women's Rugby League World Cup group stage
 2021 Wheelchair Rugby League World Cup group stage
 2021 Physical Disability Rugby League World Cup group stage

See also 
 2021 Rugby League World Cup (disambiguation)